The East Point Light, known as the Maurice River Light before 1913, is a lighthouse located in Heislerville, New Jersey on the Delaware Bay at the mouth of the Maurice River in Maurice River Township, Cumberland County, New Jersey, United States. The lighthouse was built in 1849 and is the second oldest in New Jersey, with only the Sandy Hook Light, which was built in 1764, being older. The light was inactive from 1941 and was nearly destroyed by fire in 1971. The light was reinstated by the United States Coast Guard in 1980. Exterior restoration was completed in 1999.

It was added to the National Register of Historic Places on August 25, 1995 for its significance in engineering, maritime history, and transportation. It became part of the Maurice River Lighthouse and East Point Archeological District on October 30, 2015. The lighthouse was just recently fully restored, both the exterior and interior work was completed in 2017.  The lighthouse is now both an active navigational aid and a year-round museum open to the public for tours and special events throughout the year.

Status
The light is said to be critically endangered due to erosion. Although local governments routinely shore up the property's perimeter, using  sand bags and bulldozers, the lighthouse is a mere  from the shore. There was four times the beach as revealed by 1940 aerial photos. A rally to save the lighthouse was held in the fall of 2018. Since then more sandbags have been added, paid for by the State of New Jersey and using the sandbags available the sandbag seawall was rebuilt by coordinated efforts of both the Maurice River Township and Cumberland County Road Departments. A geotube system is planned to be installed the summer of 2019 by the State of New Jersey to help hold the point and protect the lighthouse until more lasting measures can be taken.

See also
List of lighthouses in New Jersey
National Register of Historic Places listings in Cumberland County, New Jersey

References

Notes

Citations

External links 

Visiting East Point Lighthouse - New Jersey Lighthouse Society
NPS - East Point Light at Historic light stations

East Point Light - from Lighthousefriends.com

Lighthouses completed in 1849
Houses completed in 1849
1849 establishments in New Jersey
Lighthouses on the National Register of Historic Places in New Jersey
National Register of Historic Places in Cumberland County, New Jersey
New Jersey Register of Historic Places
Transportation buildings and structures in Cumberland County, New Jersey
Maurice River Township, New Jersey
Archaeological sites on the National Register of Historic Places in New Jersey